Thornycroft Athletic were a highly successful works football club based in Basingstoke, Hampshire. For many years they played in the Hampshire League but were forced to close in 1972 - just three years after winning the title, following the loss of their ground.

History
Thornycroft Athletic FC were formed in 1900, as the works side of the Thornycroft vehicle manufacturing company, and three years later they became founder members of the Basingstoke League where they twice won the title.

In 1912 Thornycroft Athletic joined the North Division of the Hampshire League but in their first two seasons they twice finished bottom but were re-elected each time. After the horrors of the Great War they were placed in the County Division (later to become Division 1) and in 1921 they finished runners-up, and also reached the final of the Hampshire Senior Cup where they beaten by Southampton Reserves. Thornycrofts remained a steady side in the top flight before being relegated as bottom club in 1931–32 and after finishing mid-table in Division 2 the following season the side withdrew from the competition to join the Southern Amateur League, winning the Senior Division 3 title in 1934-35.

When normal football resumed after World War II, Thornycrofts returned to the Hampshire League and were placed in Division 1. The post-war era saw the club remain a steady force in the league and were regular entrants in the qualifying rounds of the FA Cup but relegation in 1950–51 saw a decline in fortunes. After several years of re-building Thornycrofts won the Division 2 title in 1955–56 and returned to Division 1 where they remained for three seasons before again being relegated.

The early sixties saw Thornycrofts alternate between Divisions 1 and 2 but after winning promotion back as runners-up in 1963–64 their fortunes dramatically took off. Back in the top flight, Thornycrofts became a powerful force and after some encouraging seasons they won the title in 1968–69, three points clear of local rivals Basingstoke Town – with whom they fought many an epic battle, often in front of large crowds. Also at this time Thornycrofts also enjoyed some good runs in the qualifying rounds of the FA Cup and FA Trophy.

In 1969, the parent company relocated to Watford but the football team continued, enjoying further successes, but this was brought to an abrupt end in the summer of 1972 when the sudden loss of their ground forced the club to withdraw from the county league and fold.

Honours

Hampshire League Division 1
Champions 1968/69
Runners-up 1920/21
Hampshire League Division 2
Champions 1955/56
Runners-up 1963/64
Southern Amateur Football League Senior Division 3 
Champions 1934/35
Hampshire FA Senior Cup 
Finalists 1920/21
Hampshire FA Russell Cotes Cup 
Winners 1924/25 and 1966/67
North Hants FA May Cup
Winners 1919/20 and 1920/21
Basingstoke & District League
Champions 1911/12
Basingstoke Junior Cup
Winners 1911/12

Playing Records

League

FA Cup

FA Trophy

References

Thornycroft Athletic F.C. at Football Club History database
Thornycroft Athletic in the Southern Amateur League

Defunct football clubs in England
Association football clubs disestablished in 1972
Sport in Basingstoke
1900 establishments in England
1972 disestablishments in England
Basingstoke and District Football League
Hampshire League
Southern Amateur Football League
Defunct football clubs in Hampshire
Association football clubs established in 1900
Works association football teams in England